John Leehane can refer to:

 John Leehane (cricketer, born 1921), an Australian cricketer
 John Leehane (cricketer, born 1950), an Australian cricketer